NCS-382 is a moderately selective antagonist for the GHB receptor. It blocks the effects of GHB in animals and has both anti-sedative and anticonvulsant effects. It has been proposed as a treatment for GHB overdose in humans as well as the genetic metabolic disorder succinic semialdehyde dehydrogenase deficiency (SSADHD), but has never been developed for clinical use.

References

Carboxylic acids
Anticonvulsants
Secondary alcohols
GHB receptor antagonists